Hrysopiyi "Piyi" Devetzi (born January 2, 1976) is a retired Greek athlete who competed in the triple jump and long jump.

Devetzi was born in Alexandroupoli. She won the triple jump silver medal at the 2004 Summer Olympics with 15.25 and the triple jump bronze medal at the 2008 Summer Olympics with 15.23. At the 2004 Summer Olympics semifinal she set a Greek record of 15.32 metres. This performance ranked her in the fourth place of all time triple jumpers, after the world record holder, Inessa Kravets, her greatest rival Tatyana Lebedeva and the twice-olympic gold medalist Françoise Mbango Etone. She won another silver medal at the 2006 European Athletics Championships in Gothenburg, losing the gold at the last jump by Tatyana Lebedeva. The same story was repeated at the 2008 IAAF World Indoor Championships in Valencia, in which "Piyi" lost the 1st place at the sixth jump by Yargelis Savigne.

Devetzi was known for often jumping longer in qualification rounds than in finals, as at the 2004 Olympics, and also for her lack of gold at major championships, despite having been one of the world's leading female triple jumpers.

Doping ban 
In May 2009 Devetzi refused to submit to doping control. Failing to submit sample equals a positive test, and she was subsequently handed a two-year doping ban.

In 2016, samples given by Devetzi in August 2007 were retested revealing stanozolol.  Her subsequent results (for the next four years), covering the time until her retirement, were annulled, including the 2008 Olympic bronze medal. Her 2007 World Championship bronze medal was also annulled.

On 17 November 2016 the IOC disqualified Devetzi from the 2008 Olympic Games, stripped her Olympic bronze medal and struck her long jump and triple jump results from the record for failing a drugs test in a re-analysis of her doping sample from 2008.

Personal bests

 (*) Third among Greek long jumpers, behind Niki Xanthou (7.03) and Paraskevi Tsiamita (6.93).

Achievements

Personal best progression
(Records in bold are current ones.)

References

External links
 Official website
 
 HellenicAthletes.com: Hrysopiyi Devetzi

1976 births
Living people
Competitors stripped of Summer Olympics medals
Greek female triple jumpers
Greek female long jumpers
Doping cases in athletics
Greek sportspeople in doping cases
Sportspeople from Alexandroupolis
Athletes (track and field) at the 2004 Summer Olympics
Athletes (track and field) at the 2008 Summer Olympics
Olympic athletes of Greece
Olympic silver medalists for Greece
World Athletics Championships medalists
European Athletics Championships medalists
Medalists at the 2004 Summer Olympics
Olympiacos Athletics athletes
Panathinaikos Athletics
Olympic silver medalists in athletics (track and field)
Mediterranean Games bronze medalists for Greece
Athletes (track and field) at the 2005 Mediterranean Games
Athletes stripped of World Athletics Championships medals
Mediterranean Games medalists in athletics